Griphopithecus alpani is a species of prehistoric ape from the Miocene of Turkey.

References

Miocene primates of Asia
Fossil taxa described in 1974
Prehistoric Anatolia